Bashkiria, also called Bashkortostan, Bashkurdistan, Lesser Bashkiria, or Autonomous Bashkiria, was a short-lived autonomous state which existed from 1917 to 1919, during the Russian Civil War. Aligned with the Russian State, Bashkiria was attacked and later annexed by the Russian Soviet Federative Socialist Republic, leading to its 1919 collapse and succession by the Bashkir Autonomous Soviet Socialist Republic.

History 
The Bashkir Regional Bureau organised local councils, called shuros, to ensure the expansion of Bashkir rights. Subsequently, in July and August 1917, the first and second  were held in Orenburg and Ufa, respectively, where a consensus was reached to create a "democratic republic on a national-territorial basis as part of federal Russia."

However, following the October Revolution, the process of establishing autonomy was significantly changed. On 11 November 1917, the Central Shuro confirmed the need for an autonomous Bashkiria.

Four days later, Bashkir autonomy was declared by the Central Shuro. The declaration of autonomy was signed by Central Shuro chairman , deputy chairman Zeki Velidi Togan, and secretary Shaikhzada Babich, as well as the heads of the Central Shuro's six departments. The resolution stated, "The Bashkir Regional Council declares the Bashkir territory of the Orenburg, Ufa, Samara and Perm governorates from this 15 November an autonomous part of the Russian Republic." Local government, including railways, troops, and post offices, were taken over by the government of Bashkiria.

An independent judiciary was also established in Bashkiria in accordance with the resolutions of the Qoroltay, with laws based on those of the Russian Republic. The prospect of land reform was also considered, with the All-Bashkir Qoroltay declaring that all citizens of the region had a right to own land. The Main Department of Agriculture and Property was created as a state fund to manage land interests.

In the village of Yelpachikha, a local Bashkir council was formed, only to be massacred by Bolshevik forces shortly after its establishment. Relations continued to decline between the Bashkirs and Bolsheviks, despite a statement by Vladimir Lenin describing the Bashkir movement as "not counter-revolutionary" and "quite natural and very necessary." On 26 February 1918, the Bashkir government declared to work alongside the Bolsheviks.

Tensions, however, remained high. At first, it was approved, and the publishing of Bashkir-language texts began. However, only shortly after its establishment, the PRCB was abolished by Orenburg Oblast Executive Committee following condemnations of national autonomy, with the PRCB being explicitly compared to the Central Shuro.

By March 1918, the situation had reached a breaking point. Independent Bashkir regiments had begun clashing with the Red Army, and two members of the government (Gabdulla Idebayev and Gimran Magazov) were executed by the Bolsheviks. The Red Guards actively conducted attacks on Bashkirs and seized weapons. On 3–4 April 1918, Bashkir military commander , with assistance from Orenburg Cossacks, sieged the prison where the Bashkir government was held, leading to their release. Four days later, in Soviet-controlled Ufa, a secretive meeting of Bashkir leaders was held, and it was determined to fight the Bolsheviks.

By late May 1918, the autonomy of Bashkiria had been completely restored with the assistance of the Czechoslovak Legion. On 1 June 1918, a letter, titled "Appeal of the Bashkir government to the people", was published, calling for armed resistance to the Red Army.  was elected as interim chairman of the Central Shuro. Links were established with the government of the Russian State, Provisional Siberian Government, Committee of Members of the Constituent Assembly (Komuch), and the Orenburg Cossacks. Among their most prominent supporters was Alexander Dutov, ataman of the Orenburg Cossacks.

From 15 to 17 May 1918, a meeting of representatives from Bashkiria and the Alash Autonomy was held in the city of Kostanay, where discussions of forming a joint movement against the Bolsheviks were held. In a subsequent meeting in Samara, which also included Central Asian governments. It was decided to establish a Federation of Southeastern Muslim Regions, as part of a "Union of Eastern Russia" including Central Asia, the Alash Autonomy, Bashkiria, Siberia, Komuch, and the Orenburg and Ural Cossacks. It was additionally planned to unite the militaries of the Alash Autonomy and Bashkiria into a single army. However, these discussions never bore fruit.

From 8 to 23 September 1918, the State Meeting in Ufa was held, where members of the Bashkir movement met with other anti-Bolshevik forces as part of the Russian State. However, subsequent moves by Alexander Kolchak, including the forceful dissolution of the Bashkir Army and the transfer of its units to the Orenburg Cossacks, forced the government of Bashkiria to engage in negotiates with Bolshevik forces. A 16 February 1919 resolution by the Central Shuro affirmed the willingness of the government to work with the Bolsheviks, furthermore declaring war on the Russian State, the Orenburg Cossacks, and "all world imperialists." Additional negotiations followed, leading to the agreement between the Soviet and Bashkir governments on autonomy on 20 March 1919. Bashkiria became the Bashkir Autonomous Soviet Socialist Republic, with recognition granted to the 1917–1919 government of Bashkiria as a historical entity.

Government

Legislature 
Qualifications for membership were that candidates were at least 22 years old, and the ability for both men and women, as well as non-Bashkirs to hold office, was clearly laid out. The term of office for members of the Kese Qoroltay was three years. The first session of the Kese Qoroltay was chosen by the All-Bashkir Qoroltays, and consisted of 22 members (one member per 100,000 people).

Executive 
The executive branch of the government was represented by the government of Bashkiria and the Bashkir Central Shuro. Both the government of Bashkiria and the Kese Qoroltay were originally headquartered in the Orenburg Caravanserai. As fighting intensified in Bashkiria, however, Bashkir forces were forced to withdraw to Chelyabinsk, held by the Czechoslovak Legion.

References 

1917 establishments in Russia
1919 disestablishments in Russia
History of Bashkortostan
Bashkortostan